Tichý (feminine form: Tichá) is a Czech surname meaning literally "quiet" or "silent". Notable people include:

 Andrzej Tichý (born 1978), Swedish writer
 Irena Tichá (born 1943), Czech volleyball player
 Jana Tichá (born 1965),  Czech astronomer
 Jindra Tichá (born 1937), Czech-New Zealand academic and writer
 Jiří Tichý (1933–2016), Czech football player
 Martin Tichý (born 1968), Czech rower
 Milan Tichý (born 1969), Czech ice hockey defenceman
 Miloš Tichý (born 1966), Czech astronomer
 Miroslav Tichý (1926–2011), Czech photographer
 Otto Albert Tichý (1890–1973), Czech composer, teacher and organist
 Pavel Tichý (1936–1994), Czech logician, philosopher and mathematician
 Zdena Tichá (born 1952), Czech rower

See also 
 Cichy (surname), Polish surname with the same meaning
 Tichy (surname)
 Ticha (disambiguation)

Czech-language surnames